Robert Atkyns may refer to:
Sir Robert Atkyns (judge) (1621–1707), English judge and baron of the Exchequer
Sir Robert Atkyns (topographer) (1647–1711), English antiquary and historian

See also
Robert Atkins (disambiguation)